Graphic was a Canadian current affairs television series which aired on CBC Television from 1956 to 1957.

Premise
Joe McCulley hosted this journalistic series with announcer Rex Loring.

Initially, Graphic was promoted as a collection of "entertaining items of a real-life variety, on the premise that people are always interested in what the other fellow is doing." As the series developed, it featured interviews with notable Canadian personalities.

Graphic'''s first season was sponsored by Ford Motor Company of Canada which hoped that the series would be titled Ford Graphic. However, the CBC rejected calls to include a sponsor name to its journalistic programmes. Ford remained a sponsor for the initial thirteen episodes.

Production
Each episode of Graphic'' cost approximately $20,000 and regularly featured  camerawork outside CBC studios and often presented remove stories live. Peter Macfarlane produced the series with Bill Bolt as supervising producer, Donal Wilson as coordinating producer and Norman DePoe as editorial supervisor.

Scheduling
The half-hour series was broadcast Fridays at 9:00 p.m. for two seasons starting 2 March 1956 and ending 21 June 1957, with a break between June and October 1956.

References

External links
 

CBC Television original programming
1956 Canadian television series debuts
1957 Canadian television series endings
Black-and-white Canadian television shows